William B. Conway (January 14, 1805 – December 29, 1852) was a justice of the Arkansas Supreme Court from 1847 to 1849.

Born near Greeneville, Tennessee, Conway was the brother of Elias Nelson Conway, who became Governor of Arkansas. Conway was given no middle name at birth, but adopted one later in life:

Conway became an Arkansas circuit judge in 1830, and in 1847 was appointed to succeed Judge Edward Cross on the state supreme court. Cross was described as "a good man, but of small learning and capacity".

Conway died in Little Rock, Arkansas at the age of 47, and was buried next to his mother in Mount Holly Cemetery.

See also
 List of Arkansas adjutants general

References

External links

 
 William Conway at The Political Graveyard

Justices of the Arkansas Supreme Court
1805 births
1852 deaths
19th-century American judges
Adjutants General of Arkansas
American militia officers
Burials at Mount Holly Cemetery
People from Greeneville, Tennessee